Isabelle Mejias (born November 4, 1961) is a Canadian actress. She is most noted for her performance in the film Unfinished Business, for which she received a Genie Award nomination for Best Actress at the 6th Genie Awards in 1985.

Career 
Originally from Montreal, Quebec, Mejias had her first film role in the 1980 film Girls. She then appeared in The Lucky Star, Le Roi des cons and Julie Darling prior to 1984, when she appeared in both Unfinished Business and The Bay Boy. For Cinema Canada magazine, critic John Harkness wrote of her performance in Unfinished Business that "If this were a country with any sort of rational production/distribution/publicity system, a performance like this would mean that she would immediately be talked about in Hollywood - Mejias has star quality like you wouldn't believe."

She subsequently starred in the films Blue Line, Meatballs III: Summer Job, Higher Education, State Park, The Midday Sun and Scanners II: The New Order. She also starred in the television miniseries Echoes in the Darkness, and had supporting or guest appearances in the television series Philip Marlowe, Private Eye, The Edison Twins, Night Heat, Street Legal and Danger Bay. She received a Gemini Award nomination for Best Guest Performance in a Television Series at the 3rd Gemini Awards for Danger Bay.

Her final known acting role was in the 1996 television film Psychic Detectives, under her married name Isabelle Jamieson.

Filmography

Film

Television

References

External links

20th-century Canadian actresses
Canadian television actresses
Canadian film actresses
Actresses from Montreal
French Quebecers
Canadian people of Spanish descent
Living people
1961 births